Radio postaja Orašje or Radio Orašje is a Bosnian local public radio station, broadcasting from Orašje, Bosnia and Herzegovina.

In February 1978, Radio Orašje was launched by the municipal council. In Yugoslavia and in SR Bosnia and Herzegovina, it was part of local/municipal Radio Sarajevo network affiliate.

This radio station broadcasts a variety of programs such as news, music, morning and talk shows. Program is mainly produced in Croatian and Bosnian language. Estimated number of potential listeners of Radio Orašje is around 189,260. Radiostation is also available in Bosanska Posavina, Tuzla Canton and Brčko District area as well as in neighboring Croatia.

Frequencies
 Orašje 
 Orašje

See also 
 List of radio stations in Bosnia and Herzegovina
 Radio Preporod
 Radio postaja Odžak

References

External links 
 www.fmscan.org
 www.radioorasje.com
 Communications Regulatory Agency of Bosnia and Herzegovina

Orašje
Orašje
Radio stations established in 1978